Postcards and Daydreaming is the debut full-length release from Canadian indie singer-songwriter Dan Mangan, released independently on October 20, 2005.

The album was re-released on July 10, 2007 by the File Under Music label.

Critical reception
The album was generally well received in the Canadian indie music scene. Kerry Doole of Exclaim! noted that the album showcases Mangan's "highly promising talent" and that "Mangan's career progress will merit watching." In a review of a later Mangan album, Oh Fortune, Julian Uzielli of mitZine said, "Postcards and Daydreaming (2007), showed obvious potential, despite the fairly generic acoustic-folk sound."

The musical style of the album has been described as "sombre and melancholy" and "a good sulky-day companion".

Track listing

Personnel
Dan Mangan – vocals, guitar, piano, Fender Rhodes piano
Amy Arsenault – vocals
Simon Kelly – guitar, piano, Fender Rhodes piano
Finn Manniche – cello
Richard "Rags" Michaelski – harmonica
Ryan Naso – trumpet
Kerry Galloway – bass guitar
Randal Stoll – drums
Daniel Elmes – Record producer

Release history

References

External links
 Dan Mangan – Postcards and Daydreaming

2005 debut albums
Dan Mangan albums